Khiria is a village in West Champaran district in the Indian state of Bihar.

Demographics
As of 2011 India census, Khiria had a population of 1209 in 224 households. Males constitute 52% of the population and females 47%. Khiria has an average literacy rate of 44.58%, lower than the national average of 74%: male literacy is 64.74%, and female literacy is 35.25%. In Khiria, 17.86% of the population is under 6 years of age.

References

Villages in West Champaran district